The American Railway Association (ARA) was an industry trade group representing railroads in the United States. The organization had its inception in meetings of General Managers and ranking railroad operating officials known as Time Table Conventions, the first of which was held on October 1, 1872, at Louisville, Kentucky. In 1875, the group changed its name to General Time Convention and in October 1892, to American Railway Association. In January 1919, ten separate groups of operating officers were amalgamated with the association and carried on their activities as divisions, sections or committees of the larger group.

On October 12, 1934, the ARA ceased to exist, having joined with several other railroad industry trade groups to merge into the Association of American Railroads.

Officers
 1890–1896, Henry S. Haines, President
 1907, W. C. Brown, President
 1915, J. T. King, President
 1917, W. W. Atterbury, President
 1921, Daniel Willard, Chairman of the Board
 1921, R. H. Aishton, President

See also
 American Railway Engineering and Maintenance-of-Way Association (AREMA)
 Association of American Railroads
 History of rail transport in the United States
 Railroad chronometer

References

External links
 ARA 1934 merge into AAR, PSU.edu
 ARA items, Gutenberg.org
 ARA items, Archive.org
 MCB 1919 merge into ARA, Hathitrust.org
 MCB items, Hathitrust.org
 MCB items, Archive.org
 MCB 1864~1867 formation, Hathitrust.org

United States railroad regulation
Trade associations based in the United States